Saint Petersburg State Institute of Film and Television is a public university located in Saint Petersburg, Russia. It was founded in 1918.

History
Founded September 9, 1918, by decree of the Sovnarkom of the RSFSR in Petrograd as the Higher Institute of Photography and Phototechnics. In order to develop in Russia photographic and phototechnical knowledge in industry as well as to raise as quickly as possible the level of professional education in all fields of optical, photographic, phototechnical and printing arts and for special scientific research, a State Higher Educational Scientific, Industrial, Cultural and Educational Establishment under the name of the Higher Institute of Photography and Phototechnics was established in Petrograd.

In 1920 in the USSR was developed the technology of domestic production of photographic paper and bromogelatin negative photoplates, construction of first Soviet photo cameras and cinema projectors. X-ray film was produced.  In 1921, the Institute opened an optical fаculty.

In 1929, the first sound cinema in the USSR was opened in Leningrad. In 1930, the institute was divided into the Leningrad Institute of Film Engineers (LIKI – ЛИКИ – Ленинградский институт киноинженеров), the Film College and courses for extramural training of film technicians.

During the Second World War, the institute was evacuated to Pyatigorsk, and later, after the worsening of the military situation, to Samarkand (Uzbekistan). During the war there were about 100 people studying at the three faculties at that time.

In 1945, the institute returned to Leningrad. Since 1947, foreign students began to study at the Leningrad Institute of Film Engineers.

In the 1970s, with the rapid development of television, the Department of Film and Television Engineering was created. Research work began to unfold, aimed at improving the equipment and technology of cinematography and related industries, and scientific cooperation between LIKI and the Mosfilm and Lenfilm studios intensified.

In 1992, the institute was renamed the St. Petersburg Institute of Cinematography and Television (SPIKiT), and in 1998 it was awarded university status and became known as the St. Petersburg State University of Film and Television.

The institute is a member of the International Association of Film Schools of the World (SILEKT). Since 2001, the institute has held the annual Peterkit Student Film Festival.

Structure
 Faculty of Screen Arts 
 Faculty of Television, Design and Photography
 Faculty of Extramural, Part-time and Additional Education
 Department of Graduate and Postgraduate Studies
 Center for Pre-University Preparation and Paid Educational Services
 Film and Video College

Notes and references

Universities and colleges in Saint Petersburg